The 2014 AVP Pro Beach Volleyball Tour was a domestic professional beach volleyball circuit organized in the United States by the Association of Volleyball Professionals (AVP) for the 2014 beach volleyball season.

Schedule

This is the complete schedule of events on the 2014 calendar, with team progression documented from the semifinals stage. All tournaments consisted of single-elimination qualifying rounds followed by a double-elimination main draw.

Men

Women

Milestones and events
St. Petersburg Open
Kerri Walsh Jennings won her 67th AVP tournament, breaking the record for most AVP tournament wins.

Manhattan Beach Open
Kerri Walsh Jennings won her seventh Manhattan Beach Open, breaking the record for the most Manhattan Beach Open titles by a female player.

Points distribution

Awards
The 2014 AVP year-end award winners were announced on November 19. The season's top performers were chosen based on statistics, player votes and AVP national ranking points earned during the year.

References

Association of Volleyball Professionals
AVP Pro Beach Volleyball Tour